École polytechnique de l'université de Tours (Polytech Tours) a French engineering College created in 2002.

The school trains engineers in five majors :

 Planning and environmental engineering
 Computer Science
 Electronics and Electrical Power Systems
 Mechanics and Systems Design
 Industrial data.

Located in Tours, Polytech Tours is a public higher education institution. The school is a member of the University of Tours.

References

External links
 Polytech Tours

Engineering universities and colleges in France
Polytech Tours
Tours, France
Educational institutions established in 2002
2002 establishments in France